Ruby Rose (born Ruby Rose Langenheim in 1986) is an Australian model and actress.

Ruby Rose may refer to:

People 
 Ruby Rose Aldridge (born 1991), U.S. fashion model and actress
 Ruby Rose Fox, U.S. musician, honored at the New England Music Awards
 Ruby Rose Neri (born 1970), U.S. artist
 Ruby Rose Roba, former owner of the Roba Ranch
 Ruby Rose Turner, a U.S. actress

Fictional characters
 Ruby Rose (RWBY), protagonist of the animated web series RWBY
 Ruby Rose, the main character of Australian film The Tale of Ruby Rose (1988)

Other uses
 Ruby Rose, a sub-order of the occult organization Hermetic Order of the Golden Dawn

See also

 Pink ruby (rose ruby), a rose-colored precious stone, a ruby
 Ruby (disambiguation)
 Rose (disambiguation)
 Rubi Rose (born 1997), American rapper, songwriter and model